Diarmaid Byrnes (born 1994) is an Irish hurler who plays as a right wing-back for club side Patrickswell and at inter-county level with the Limerick senior hurling team.

Playing career

University

During his studies at Limerick Institute of Technology, Byrnes was selected for the college's senior hurling team for the Fitzgibbon Cup.

Club

Byrnes joined the Patrickswell club at a young age and played in all grades at juvenile and underage levels.

On 23 October 2016, Byrnes won a Limerick Hurling Championship medal after scoring six points from centre-back in Patrickswell's 1-26 to 1-07 defeat of Ballybrown in the final.

Byrnes lined out in a second Limerick Championship final on 6 October 2019. Playing at centre-back, he scored two points, including a long-range free, and collected a second winners' medal following the 1-17 to 0-15 defeat of Na Piarsaigh.

Inter-county

Minor and under-21

Byrnes first played for Limerick at minor level in 2012, in a season which ended with a defeat by Clare in the Munster Championship semi-final.

Byrnes subsequently joined the Limerick under-21 hurling team. He made his first appearance on 4 June 2014, however, he was sent off after receiving two yellow cards in a 2-20 to 1-14 defeat by Clare.

In his second season with the team Byrnes won a Munster Championship medal after a 0-22 to 0-19 win over Clare in the final. On 12 September 2015, Byrnes was at right wing-back when Limerick defeated Wexford by0-26 to 1-07 in the All-Ireland final. He ended the season by being named on the Bord Gáis Energy Team of the Year.

Senior

Byrnes made his first appearance for the Limerick senior hurling team on 13 February 2016 in a 2-23 to 0-15 defeat of Wexford in the National Hurling League. Later that season he made his first championship appearance in a 3-12 to 1-16 defeat by Tipperary in the Munster Championship.

In April 2017, Byrnes sustained a knee injury which rules him out of the championship.

On 19 August 2018, Byrnes scored a point from right wing-back when Limerick won their first All-Ireland title in 45 years after a 3-16 to 2-18 defeat of Galway in the final. Later that day he was named on The Sunday Game Team of the Year. Byrnes ended the season by being nominated for an All-Star Award.

On 31 March 2019, Byrnes was selected at left wing-back for Limerick's National League final meeting with Waterford at Croke Park. He collected a winners' medal following the 1-24 to 0-19 victory. On 30 June 2019, Byrnes won a Munster Championship medal after scoring three long-range frees from right wing-back in Limerick's 2-26 to 2-14 defeat of Tipperary in the final.

Career statistics

Honours

Patrickswell
Limerick Senior Hurling Championship (2): 2016, 2019

Limerick
 All-Ireland Senior Hurling Championship (4): 2018, 2020,2021,2022
 Munster Senior Hurling Championship (4): 2019, 2020, 2021, 2022
National Hurling League (2): 2019, 2020
 All-Ireland Under-21 Hurling Championship (1): 2015 (c)
 Munster Under-21 Hurling Championship (1): 2015 (c)

Awards
The Sunday Game Team of the Year (4): 2018, 2020, 2021,2022
The Sunday Game Hurler of the Year: 2022
All-Star Award (3): 2020, 2021, 2022
 GAA-GPA All-Star Hurler of the Year (1): 2022

References

1994 births
Living people
Patrickswell hurlers
Limerick inter-county hurlers
All Stars Awards winners (hurling)